Bang Chalong is a tambon (subdistrict) of Bang Phli District, in Samut Prakan Province, Thailand. In 2017 it had a total population of 41,834 people.

Etymology
Its name "Bang Chalong", presumed to be from the Khmer word "Chanlong" (จรรโลง), literally 'lifting'. Which means lifting yo (ยอ; a kind of traditional Thai fishing tool) and boats from the water of local canal Khlong Samrong. While "Bang" refers to 'community on the waterfront', thus "Bang Chalong" can be translated as 'lifting place'.

Administration

Central administration
The tambon is subdivided into 11 administrative villages (muban).

Local administration
The area of the subdistrict is shared by 2 local governments.
the subdistrict municipality (Thesaban Tambon) Bang Phli (เทศบาลตำบลบางพลี)
the subdistrict administrative organization (SAO) Bang Chalong (องค์การบริหารส่วนตำบลบางโฉลง)

References

External links
Thaitambon.com on Bang Chalong

Tambon of Samut Prakan Province